Electoral history of Herbert Hoover, who served as the 31st president of the United States (1929–1933) and 3rd United States Secretary of Commerce (1921–1928).

1920 Democratic presidential primaries:
 Unpledged delegates - 165,460 (29.85%)
 A. Mitchell Palmer - 91,543 (16.51%)
 James M. Cox - 86,194 (15.55%)
 William McAdoo - 74,987 (13.53%)
 Gilbert M. Hitchcock - 37,452 (6.76%)
 Edward I. Edwards - 28,470 (5.14%)
 Herbert Hoover - 28,042 (5.06%)
 William Jennings Bryan - 20,893 (3.77%)
 Robert G. Ross - 13,179 (2.38%)
 James W. Gerard - 4,706 (0.85%)

1920 Republican presidential primaries:
 Hiram W. Johnson - 965,651 (30.30%)
 Leonard Wood - 710,863 (22.30%)
 Frank O. Lowden - 389,127 (12.21%)
 Herbert Hoover - 303,815 (9.53%)
 Unpledged delegates - 298,109 (9.35%)
 Edward R. Wood - 257,841 (8.09%)
 Warren G. Harding - 144,762 (4.54%)
 John J. Pershing - 45,640 (1.43%)
 Howard Sutherland - 33,849 (1.06%)

1920 Republican National Convention (Presidential tally):

1928 Republican presidential primaries:
 Herbert Hoover - 2,045,928 (49.73%)
 Frank O. Lowden - 1,317,799 (32.03%)
 George W. Norris - 259,548 (6.31%)
 James Eli Watson - 228,795 (5.56%)
 Guy D. Goff - 128,429 (3.12%)
 Frank B. Willis - 84,461 (2.05%)
 Calvin Coolidge (inc.) - 12,985 (0.32%)
 Charles G. Dawes - 12,297 (0.30%)

1928 Republican National Convention (Presidential tally):
 Herbert Hoover - 837 (76.86%)
 Frank O. Lowden - 74 (6.80%)
 Charles Curtis - 64 (5.88%)
 James Eli Watson - 45 (4.13%)
 George W. Norris - 24 (2.20%)
 Guy D. Goff - 18 (1.65%)
 Calvin Coolidge (inc.) - 17 (1.56%)
 Blank - 5 (0.46%)
 Charles G. Dawes - 4 (0.37%)
 Charles Evans Hughes - 1 (0.09%)

1928 United States presidential election:
 Herbert Hoover/Charles Curtis (R) - 21,427,123 (58.2%) and 444 electoral votes (40 states carried)
 Al Smith/Joseph Taylor Robinson (D) - 15,015,464 (40.8%) and 87 electoral votes (8 states carried)
 Norman Thomas/James H. Maurer (Socialist) - 267,478 (0.7%)
 William Z. Foster/Benjamin Gitlow (Communist) - 48,551 (0.1%)
 Others - 48,396 (0.1%)

1932 Republican presidential primaries:
 Joseph I. France - 1,137,948 (47.50%)
 Herbert Hoover (incumbent) - 861,602 (35.96%)
 George W. Norris - 139,514 (5.82%)
 Jacob S. Coxey - 100,844 (4.21%)
 Hiram W. Johnson - 64,464 (2.69%)
 Olin J. Ross - 48,867 (2.04%)
 Unpledged delegates - 1,236 (0.05%)
 Others - 6,126 (0.26%)

1932 Republican National Convention (Presidential tally):
 Herbert Hoover (incumbent) - 1,127 (97.92%)
 John J. Blaine - 13 (1.13%)
 Calvin Coolidge - 5 (0.43%)
 Joseph I. France - 4 (0.35%)
 Charles W. Dawes - 1 (0.09%)
 James W. Wadsworth - 1 (0.09%)

1932 United States presidential election
 Franklin D. Roosevelt/John Nance Garner (D) - 22,821,277 (57.4%) and 472 electoral votes (42 states carried)
 Herbert Hoover/Charles Curtis (R) (inc.) - 15,761,254 (39.7%) and 59 electoral votes (6 states carried)
 Norman Thomas/James H. Maurer (Socialist) - 884,885 (2.2%)
 William Z. Foster/James H. Ford (Communist) - 103,307 (0.3%)
 William D. Upshaw/Frank S. Regan (Prohibition) - 81,905 (0.2%)
 William Hope Harvey/Frank Hemenway (Liberty) - 53,425 (0.1%)
 Verne L. Reynolds/J.W. Aiken (Socialist Labor) - 33,276 (0.1%)
 Others - 12,569 (0.1%)

1936 Republican presidential primaries:
 William E. Borah - 1,478,676 (44.48%)
 Alf Landon - 729,908 (21.96%)
 Frank Knox - 527,054 (15.85%)
 Earl Warren - 350,917 (10.56%)
 Stephen A. Day - 155,732 (4.69%)
 Warren E. Green - 44,518 (1.34%)
 Leo J. Chassee - 18,986 (0.57%)
 Herbert Hoover - 7,750 (0.23%)

1940 Republican presidential primaries
 Thomas E. Dewey - 1,605,754 (49.76%)
 Jerrold L. Seawell - 538,112 (16.68%)
 Robert A. Taft - 516,428 (16.00%)
 Unpledged - 186,157 (5.77%)
 Charles L. McNary - 133,488 (4.14%)
 R. N. Davis - 106,123 (3.29%)
 Arthur H. Vandenberg - 100,651 (3.12%)
 Wendell Willkie - 21,140 (0.66%)
 Franklin D. Roosevelt (inc.) - 9,496 (0.29%)
 Arthur H. James - 8,172 (0.25%)
 Herbert Hoover - 1,082 (0.03%)
 John W. Bricker - 188 (0.01%) 

1940 Republican National Convention (Presidential tally):

First ballot:
 Thomas E. Dewey - 360
 Robert A. Taft - 189
 Wendell Willkie - 105
 Arthur H. Vandenberg - 76
 Arthur H. James - 74
 Joseph William Martin - 44
 Scattering - 40
 Hanford MacNider - 34
 Frank E. Gannett - 33
 Styles Bridges - 28
 Herbert Hoover - 17

Second ballot:
 Thomas E. Dewey - 338
 Robert A. Taft - 203
 Wendell Willkie - 171
 Arthur H. Vandenberg - 73
 Arthur H. James - 66
 Hanford MacNider - 34
 Frank E. Gannett - 30
 Scattering - 29
 Joseph William Martin - 26
 Herbert Hoover - 21 
 Styled Bridges - 9

Third ballot:
 Thomas E. Dewey - 315
 Wendell Willkie - 259
 Robert A. Taft - 212
 Arthur H. Vandenberg - 72
 Arthur H. James - 59
 Herbert Hoover - 32
 Hanford McNider - 28
 Frank E. Gannett - 11
 Scattering - 11
 Styles Bridges - 1

Fourth ballot:
 Wendell Willkie - 306
 Robert A. Taft - 254
 Thomas E. Dewey - 250
 Arthur H. Vandenberg - 61
 Arthur H. James - 56
 Herbert Hoover - 31
 Scattering - 11 
 Frank E. Gannett - 4
 Styles Bridges - 1

Fifth ballot:
 Wendell Willkie - 429
 Robert A. Taft - 377
 Arthur H. James - 59
 Thomas E. Dewey - 57
 Arthur H. Vandenberg - 42
 Herbert Hoover - 20
 Scattering - 11
 Handorf MacNider - 4
 Frank E. Gannett - 1

Sixth ballot (before shifts):
 Wendell Willkie - 655
 Robert A. Taft - 318
 Thomas E. Dewey - 11
 Herbert Hoover - 10
 Scattering - 5
 Frank E. Gannett - 1

References

Herbert Hoover
Hoover, Herbert
Hoover, Herbert